Rimington may refer to:

Rimington, Lancashire, England
Rimington, Ontario, Canada
Dave Rimington Trophy, an award in American football

People with the surname
Dave Rimington, American football player
Michael Rimington, British Army officer
Sammy Rimington, jazz musician
Stella Rimington, Director General of MI5 1992–1996

See also
 Remington (disambiguation)
 Rimmington (disambiguation)